Lars Mattias Winnerbäck (born 19 October 1975 in Stockholm) is a Swedish singer and songwriter. He was born in Stockholm but spent his childhood in Vidingsjö, Linköping, where he attended Katedralskolan. He moved back to Stockholm in 1996, the same year he released his first album, Dans med svåra steg. He is now one of Sweden's most popular artists.

The influence of songwriters like Carl Michael Bellman, Evert Taube, Bob Dylan, Ulf Lundell and Cornelis Vreeswijk shines through in Winnerbäck's exclusively Swedish lyrics, which deal with shallowness, prejudice in society, as well as romance, relationships and anxiety. Several songs depict the difference between living in small town Linköping and the capital Stockholm.

His vinyl records were re-released in October 2011, many of them charting again on the Sverigetopplistan, the official Swedish Albums Chart.

Winnerbäck has been the subject of two full-length documentary films, Solen i ögonen – En film om Lars Winnerbäck (2008, directed by Magnus Gertten) and Winnerbäck - Ett slags liv (2017, directed by Øystein Karlsen).

Discography

Studio albums
Dans med svåra steg (1996)
Rusningstrafik (1997)
Med solen i ögonen (1998)
Kom (1999)
Singel (2001)
Söndermarken (2003)
Vatten under broarna (2004)
Daugava (2007)
Tänk om jag ångrar mig och sen ångrar mig igen (2009)
Utanför Album 1 & 2 (2012)
Hosianna (2013)
Granit och morän (2016)
Eldtuppen (2019)
Själ och hjärta (2022)

Compilations and live albums
Bland skurkar, helgon och vanligt folk (1999)...Live för dig! (2001)Stackars hela Sverige: Bränt krut vol. 1 (2005)Bränt krut vol. 2 (2005)Efter nattens bränder (2006)Vi var där blixten hittade ner – Bränt krut vol. 3 (2008)Over Grensen – De Beste 1996–2009 (2009)Lars Winnerbäck Globen 2019.11.29 (2020)

DVDLive i Linköping (Live)Solen i Ögonen (Documentary)Ett slags liv (Documentary)''

Awards
 1999
 Grammis – Best Songwriter
2001
 Grammis – Best Male Pop/Rock
 2004
 Rockbjörn – Best Male Performer
 Grammis – Best Rock album (solo)
 Grammis – Best Songwriter
 2005
 P3 Guldmicken – Best Live act
 2006
 P3 Guldmicken – Best Live act
 STIMs platinagitarr
 Rockbjörn – Best Male Performer
 2007
 Grammis – Song of the Year, "Om du lämnade mig nu"
 P3 Guld – Best Male Performer
 Rockbjörn – Best Male Performer
 Rockbjörn – Song of the Year, "Om du lämnade mig nu"
 2009
 Evert Taube-stipendiet
 2010
 Grammis – Best Performer
 Grammis – Best Male Performer
 P3 Guld – Best Performer
 P3 Guldmicken – Best Live Act

References

External links
 Lars Winnerbäck – Official site in Swedish

1975 births
Living people
Singers from Stockholm
Swedish-language singers
21st-century Swedish singers
21st-century Swedish male singers
Sonet Records artists